A dark 'n' stormy is a highball cocktail made with dark rum (the "dark") and ginger beer (the "stormy") served over ice and garnished with a slice of lime. Lime juice and simple syrup are also frequently added. This drink is very similar to the Moscow mule except that the Dark 'n' Stormy has dark rum instead of vodka. The original Dark 'n' Stormy was made with Gosling Black Seal rum and Barritt's Ginger Beer, but after the partnership between the two failed and the companies parted ways, Gosling Brothers created its own ginger beer. 

Gosling Brothers claims that the drink was invented in Bermuda just after World War I.

Trademark and litigation 

In the United States, "Dark 'n' Stormy" has been a registered trademark of Gosling Brothers Ltd of Bermuda since 1991. Gosling's markets the drink through tie-ins to the sailing and sail racing community.

Gosling Brothers uses this registration to prohibit US marketing of a drink under the name "Dark 'n Stormy", or a related, confusing name, unless it is made with Gosling Black Seal rum. Gosling's has litigated or threatened litigation over the mark against Pernod Ricard, Proximo Spirits, Picaroons Traditional Ales, Infinium Spirits' Zaya, and a cocktail blog.

Naming 
Gosling Brothers has registered a version of the name that uses one apostrophe ('N), while the International Bartenders Association uses two apostrophes ('N').

Because of Gosling Brothers' threats of litigation, some sources use other variations on the name, such as "safe harbor", to offer similar drinks.

Variations
A cider and stormy, or dark 'n' stormy cider, or dark and stormy orchard, is a mix of dark rum, apple cider, and ginger beer. The fall dark 'n' stormy contains bourbon, apple cider, lemon juice, and ginger beer.

See also 
Other trademarked cocktails include:

 Hand Grenade
 Painkiller
 Sazerac

Related cocktails:

 Buck (cocktail) (family of cocktails using ginger beer and lime; a dark 'n' stormy with lime juice may be called a rum buck)

References

External links

Gosling's Brothers' US Trademark Registration

Cocktails with dark rum
Bermudian cuisine
Two-ingredient cocktails
Cocktails with ginger beer